Simo Lampinen (born 22 June 1943) is a Finnish former rally driver, and one of the first of the "Flying Finns" who came to dominate the sport.

Biography

Lampinen was born in Porvoo. Having contracted polio at a young age, he was left with a pronounced limp, and as a result he was granted a driving licence aged 17 so he could travel to and from school more easily. He quickly graduated to competitive driving, and won the Finnish Rally Championship twice in succession in 1963 and 1964.

His early victories were in the Saab 96, before being lured to Lancia in 1970 where he continued his winning ways. He also drove for Peugeot, Fiat and Triumph, though without the same success.

More recently, he has been Clerk of the Course at the Rally Finland, the event he won three times himself, and he has also assisted Saab in two racing events; their Saab 900 Talladega Challenge in Alabama in 1996 where several speed records were set, and the 2000 Pikes Peak race, when Per Eklund won in a race-prepped Saab 9-3 Viggen.

International victories

1963
13th 1000 Lakes Rally (Saab 96)

1964
14th 1000 Lakes Rally (Saab 96)

1968
17th RAC Rally (Saab 96 V4)

1970
3º TAP Rallye de Portugal (Lancia Fulvia)

1972
15ème Rallye du Maroc (Lancia Fulvia 1.6 Coupé HF)
22nd 1000 Lakes Rally (Saab 96 V4)

Complete IMC results

References
Profile of Lampinen at FlyingFinns.com
Career results of Lampinen at Rallybase.nl

1943 births
Finnish rally drivers
World Rally Championship drivers
Living people
People from Porvoo
24 Hours of Le Mans drivers
World Sportscar Championship drivers
Sportspeople from Uusimaa